is a Japanese actor. He rose to prominence portraying Gentaro Kisaragi in Kamen Rider Fourze, and has since starred in television series Koinaka (2016) and My Lover's Secret (2017), as well as films Strobe Edge (2015), My Tomorrow, Your Yesterday (2016), Bleach (2018), and Kaiji: Final Game (2020).

Filmography

Television

Film

Bibliography

Photobooks
 After Chicken Rice Go To Merlion: Sōta Fukushi's First Photobook (Tokyo News Service, 30 May 2012) 
 Men's Photore Vol.2 Sōta Fukushi (Tokyo News Service, 22 August 2012) 
 Blue (Wani Books, 20 September 2013) 
 Fukushi Sōta no "Hajimete no ◯◯" (Shufunotomo, 5 June 2015)

Awards
 Elan d'or Awards: Newcomer of the Year, 2014
 38th Japan Academy Film Prize: Newcomer of the Year

References

External links

  
 
 
 

1993 births
Male actors from Tokyo
Japanese male television actors
Living people
21st-century Japanese male actors
Ken-On artists
Japanese male film actors